Valavoor, the business center of Karoor Panchayath, is located at the south-western tip of India near Palai in Kottayam district, Kerala. 
Valavoor is between Pala and Uzhavoor.  Both towns are 6 km away. It is just 30 km away from the administrative capital Kottayam District. The newly started Indian Institute of Information Technology is situated here. The town is 170 km from the state capital Thiruvananthapuram.

Geography 
Valavoor is a village located in the Kottayam District of Kerala. Valavoor has located about 6 km from Pala and 6 km from Uzhavoor. Valavoor belongs to the Pala constituency. Valavoor is surrounded by small, but beautiful places like Kudakkachira, Edanad, and Palackattumala. The Mountain called 'St. Thomas Mount' is situated very close to Valavoor.

Transportation 

 Nearest Airport - Cochin International Airport - 66 km
 Nearest Railway Station - Kottayam - 31 km
 Nearest Bus Stop - Valavoor
 Nearest Bus Stand - Pala - 6 km

References 

Villages in Kottayam district